A night-cellar is a cellar which is open for business at night, typically providing food, drink and entertainment.  There were many such in London in the 18th century and they were often disreputable.

London
George Augustus Sala wrote an account of Evans's Supper Rooms in 1852.  This was a famous supper club which would serve hearty food and raucous entertainment in the middle of the night – as late as one in the morning.  But he lamented that the night-cellars of the previous century had mostly disappeared in London:

New York
In the 1840s, there was a popular night-cellar in New York called Butter-Cake Dick's.  This was a favourite of the b'hoys and g'hals – the rough young folk of lower Manhattan.  Later in the US, cellar bars and clubs became known as dives because one could dive into them without being seen.

References

Nightclubs in London
Types of drinking establishment